Jayton-Girard Independent School District is a public school district based in Jayton, Texas (USA).  It was created by the merger of the Girard School in nearby Girard with Jayton in 1969.  Jayton-Girard ISD has one school Jayton School that serves students in grades pre-kindergarten through twelve.

Academic achievement
In 2009, the school district was rated "recognized" by the Texas Education Agency.

Special programs

Athletics
Jayton High School plays six-man football.

See also

List of school districts in Texas 
List of high schools in Texas

References

External links
Jayton-Girard ISD

School districts in Kent County, Texas